Black dragon may refer to:

Arts and entertainment
The Black Dragon (comic book), a 1980s comic book series
Black Tiger (video game), a 1987 video game known as Black Dragon in Japan
Miracles (1989 film) or Black Dragon, a film by Jackie Chan
Black Dragons, a 1942 American film starring Bela Lugosi
"Black Dragon", a song on Luca Turilli's 1999 album King of the Nordic Twilight
"Black Dragon", a song on Dissection's 2006 album Reinkaos

Fictional entities
Black dragon (Dungeons & Dragons), an evil species of dragon with an acid-breath weapon 
Black Dragon Ninja, an enemy of the Arashigake clan in the G.I. Joe: A Real American Hero franchise
Black Dragon Society (comics), a fictional version of the Black Dragon Society
A criminal organization that appears in the Mortal Kombat series
Black dragons, also known as dangerous first-class monsters, a category of monster in the Monster Hunter series

Other uses
Black Dragon Fighting Society, a martial arts organization created by Count Dante
Black Dragon River (or Amur), a river on the Russia/China border
Black Dragon Society, a Japanese right-wing paramilitary group
Black Dragons (gang), a Chinese/American criminal organization
240 mm howitzer M1, a towed howitzer used by the United States Army, popularly nicknamed "Black Dragon"
USS New Jersey (BB-62) or "Black Dragon", a U.S. Navy battleship
Mascot of Seoul National University of Science and Technology
Nickname of the tidal bore on the Qiantang River